Eurosport 1 is a French television sports network channel which is a division of Eurosport and a subsidiary of Warner Bros. Discovery. Discovery took a 20% minority interest share in December 2012, and became majority shareholder in the Eurosport venture with TF1 in January 2014, taking a 51% share of the company, On 22 July 2015 Discovery agreed to acquire TF1's remaining 49% stake in the venture.

The channel is available in 73 countries, in 21 languages providing viewers with European and international sporting events. Eurosport first launched on European satellites on 5 February 1989. On 13 November 2015 Eurosport changed the name of its main channel into Eurosport 1.

Sporting events

Eurosport provides viewers with European and international sporting events, certain events are not available in a particular country due to Eurosport not being the rights holder in that territory.

Football
UEFA Nations League (Denmark only)
European Qualifiers (Denmark only)
UEFA Euro 2020 qualifying
2022 FIFA World Cup qualification
UEFA National Team Friendlies (Denmark only)
UEFA Women's Champions League (exclude final from 2018 to 2019 season)
DFB-Pokal (Poland only)
 Hero I-league (Only for Europe and central Asia)
 Ekstraklasa (except Germany and the UK)
 Eliteserien
Coupe de France (France Only)
CAF African Cup of Nations (only for Ireland, Portugal, Spain, and UK)

Basketball 

 EuroLeague (only for Ireland, Italy, and UK)
 EuroCup (only for Ireland, Italy, Poland, and UK)
 Serie A (Italy only)
 Coppa Italia (Italy only)
 Supercoppa Italiana (Italy only)

Motorsport
Eurosport Events is the Eurosport group's world-class sporting events management/promotion/production division, which promotes the FIA World Touring Car Championship (WTCC), the FIA European Touring Car Cup and the FIA European Rally Championship. Eurosport broadcasts every WTCC race live and every ERC rally either live or with daily highlights.

Eurosport Events (formerly known as 'KSO Kigema Sports Organisation Ltd') was also the promoter of the Intercontinental Rally Challenge, a rival rallying series to the World Rally Championship. The IRC ceased at the end of the 2012 season, with Eurosport taking over series promotion of the ERC from 2013.

Since 2008, the Eurosport Group has also been broadcasting the annual 24 Hours of Le Mans in full.

Eurosport airs MotoGP and Superbike World Championship in France and Germany, and has Spanish broadcasting rights for NASCAR and IndyCar Series.

On 29 September 2015, Eurosport acquired the Portuguese broadcasting rights for Formula One between 2016 and 2018.

Other sports

Other sporting events shown on Eurosport include the Dakar Rally, Monte Carlo Rally, athletics events such as World Athletics Championships and the European Athletics Championships, cycling events such as the Tour de France, Giro d'Italia and the Vuelta a España, tennis events including the French Open, Australian Open, Wimbledon (only for Belgium and shared coverage with the BBC in the UK) and the US Open, World Championship Snooker, ICC World Twenty20, ICC Cricket World Cup, ICC Champions Trophy, Sudirman Cup, All England Open Badminton Championships, Australian Football League, basketball events such as Eurocup Basketball and Olympiakos Piraeus home matches in the Greek Basket League (only for Poland), PGA Tour (only for Italy), winter sports, skating and surfing.

In June 2015 it was announced that Eurosport had secured the pan-European rights (except Russia) to the winter and summer Olympic Games between 2018 and 2024.

Feeds
In Europe, Eurosport 1 is generally available in basic cable and satellite television packages. Since 1999, Eurosport 1 provides various opt-out services providing more relevant sporting content specific to language, advertising and commentary needs. Eurosport offers a stand-alone channel which provides a standardised version of the channel (Eurosport International in English). Alongside this there are also local Eurosport channels in France, United Kingdom, Italy, Germany, Poland, Nordic region, Benelux region, and Asia Pacific. These channels offer greater sporting content with local sporting events, while also utilising the existing pan-European feed. The German version of Eurosport is the only one available free-to-air on European digital satellite television.

Eurosport 1 is currently broadcast in twenty one languages: English, French, German, Italian, Spanish, Portuguese, Dutch, Swedish, Norwegian, Danish, Finnish, Icelandic, Russian, Polish, Czech, Hungarian, Romanian, Bulgarian, Serbian, Greek, Turkish and Persian.

On 9 March 2022, Discovery Inc. closed Eurosport 1 in Russia due to Russia's invasion of Ukraine.

HD feed

A high-definition simulcast feed of Eurosport started broadcasting on 25 May 2008. The first event covered in HD was the 2008 French Open at Roland Garros. On 13 November 2015 it changed its name to Eurosport 1 HD.

Availability

Terrestrial

 Boxer (Sweden): Channel 40
 Digitenne (Netherlands): Channel 18 (HD)
 Lattelecom (Latvia): Channel 19
 PlusTV (Finland): Channel 45
 Digital terrestrial television (Germany):
 Channel 28 (Hanover)
Channel 36 (Cologne/Bonn)
Channel 46 (Hamburg)
Channel 52 (Ruhr area)
Channel 56 (Berlin)
Channel 60 (Braunschweig)
Channel 257 (Italy)

Satellite

 Astra 19.2°E: 12.227 GHz H / 27500 (German, FTA)
 Allente (Denmark, Finland, Norway, Sweden):
 Alma TV (Russia): Channel 60
 A1 Bulgaria (Bulgaria): Channel 115
 Antik Sat (Czech Republic): Channel 69
 Big Bang TV (Russia):
 Bulsatcom (Bulgaria): Channel 18
 Canal+ (France): Channel 63
 Canal+ Caraïbes (Overseas France): Channel 124
 DigitAlb (Albania): Channel
 Digiturk (Turkey): Channel 71
 Direct One (Hungary): Channel 122
 D-Smart (Turkey): Channel 75
 Focus Sat (Czech Republic): Channel 67
 Fotelka (Czech Republic): Channel 101
 HD+ (Germany):
 HD Austria (Austria):
 Home 3 (Estonia, Lithuania, Latvia):
 M7 Deutschland (Germany):
 MEO (Portugal): Channel 36
 Movistar Plus+ (Spain): Channel 66
 M:Sat TV (Serbia): Channel 39
 NOS (Portugal): Channel 143
 Nova (Greece): Channel 112
 Neosat (Bulgaria):
 Orange Polska (Poland): Channel 111
 Otau TV (Russia):
 Platforma Canal+ (Poland): Channel 113
 Polsat Box (Poland): Channel 120
 Sky (UK & Ireland): Channel 410
 Sky Italia (Italy): 210
 Telly (Czech Republic): Channel 29
 Tivibu (Turkey): Channel 71
 Telemach (Slovenia):
 Total TV (Bosnia and Herzegovina): Channel 180
 Total TV (Croatia): Channel 120
 Total TV (North Macedonia): Channel 170
 Total TV (Serbia): Channel 170
 T-Home (Hungary): Channel 47
 Viasat Ukraine (Ukraine):
 Vivacom (Bulgaria): Channel 233 (SD)
 yes (Israel): Channel 61

Cable
 Cablelink (Philippines): Channel 55 (SD)
 Caiway (Netherlands): Channel 20 (HD)
 Com Hem (Sweden): Channel 10, Channel 102 (HD)
 DELTA (Netherlands): Channel 32 (HD)
 Destiny Cable (Philippines): Channel 214 (Digital)
 Digi TV (Hungary): Channel 33
 Hot (Israel): Channel 49
 Kabel Deutschland (Germany): Channel 402 (SD) / 446 (HD)
 Kabel Noord (Netherlands): Channel 300 (HD)
 Lattelecom: Channel 401, Channel 403 (HD)
 Nacional'nye kabel'nye seti (Russia): Channel 54
 Naxoo: Channel 163 (Deutsch), Channel 248 (Spanish)
 Nowo (Portugal): Channel 67, Channel 216 (HD)
 NOS (Portugal): Channel 26, Channel 27 (HD)
 Numericable (France): Channel 151 (HD)
 RCS&RDS (Romania): Channel 23
 Serbia Broadband: Channel 267, Channel 136 (HD)
 SkyCable (Philippines): Channel 214 (SD), Channel 249 (HD)
 Telenet (Brussels & Wallonia): Channel 49 (HD, French), Channel 621 (HD, English/Dutch)
 Telenet (Flanders): Channel 210 (HD, English/Dutch), Channel 220 (French)
 T-Home (Hungary): Channel 9
 T-Home Digital (Hungary): Channel S26
 UPC Digital (Hungary): Channel 44 (HD), Channel 45
 UPC (Hungary): Channel 13
 UPC Poland (Poland): Channel 564, Channel 565 (HD)
 UPC (Romania): Channel 203 (digital with DVR), Channel 73 (digital)
 Virgin Media Ireland: Channel 423, Channel 424 (HD)
 Virgin Media (UK): Channel 521 (HD)
 Vodafone TV (Spain): Channel 250 (HD)
 WightFibre (UK): Channel 87
 Ziggo (Netherlands): Channel 20 (HD), Channel 941 (SD)
 Macau Cable TV:Channel 630
 Türksat Kablo TV (Turkey): Channel S21
 ArtMotion(Kosovo): Channel 81
 Kujtesa(Kosovo): Channel 120
 IPKO(Kosovo): Channel 216(HD) Channel 234(SD)
 DigitAlb(Albania)

IPTV

 A1 TV (Austria): Channel 99 (SD)
 BT (United Kingdom): Channel 412, Channel 435 (HD)
 CHT MOD (Taiwan): Channel 216
 Cosmote TV (Greece): Channel 21
 eir Vision (Ireland): Channel 413, Channel 427 (HD)
 iNES (Romania): Channel
 KPN (Netherlands): Channel 35 (HD)
 MEO (Portugal): Channel 36 (HD), Channel 37
 Moldtelecom (Moldova): Channel 301
 Movistar Plus+ (Spain): Channel 61 (HD, SD)
 On Telecoms (Greece): Channel 46
 Open IPTV (Serbia): Channel 561
 Orange TV (Spain): Channel 100 (HD)
 Singtel TV (Singapore): Channel 112 (HD) (11 August 2015 to 31 July 2018), Channel 116 (1 October 2021 - now) 
 SK Telecom B TV (South Korea): Channel 654
 Tele2 (Netherlands): Channel 38
 Telekom Entertain (Germany): Channel 50 (SD)
 T-Home (Hungary): Channel
 T-Mobile (Netherlands): Channel 131 (HD)
 Tivibu (Turkey): Channel 85
 TPG IPTV (Australia): Channel 677
 Vodafone TV (Greece): Channel 551 (HD)
 Vodafone TV Net Voz (Portugal): Channel 25, Channel 26 (HD)
 myTV Super (Hong Kong): Channel 305
 Xbox 360 (Australia): Channel 511
 MojaTV (Bosnia and Herzegovina): Channel 34

Online
 eurosport.com (Europe and wider region): Watch live, subscription required 
 Virgin TV Go (Ireland): Watch live
 Virgin TV Anywhere (UK): Watch live
 Ziggo GO (Netherlands): Watch live
 DAZN (Italy)

Viewing share
Being an international channel, Eurosport's performance differs significantly between countries. The figures below show the channel's share of overall viewing in some countries.

References

External links

 
 Eurosport Player

Eurosport
Television channels and stations established in 1989
Multilingual broadcasters
Sports television channels in the United Kingdom
Television stations in France
Television stations in Germany
Television channels in the Netherlands
Television channels in Flanders
Television channels in Belgium
Television channels in Poland
Television stations in Romania
Defunct television channels in Russia
Television stations in Turkey
Television channels in North Macedonia
Sports television in Poland
Sports television in Denmark
Sports television networks in France
Sports television in Germany
Sports television in Hungary
Sports television in Italy
Sports television in Spain
Sports television in North Macedonia
Television channels in Italy
Olympics on television
Sports television in Malaysia
Sports television in Singapore
Television stations in Denmark
Pay television
Sports television in Russia
Mass media in the European Union
Sports television in Belgium